Onomastus nigricaudus, is a species of spider of the genus Onomastus. It is endemic to Sri Lanka.

References

Endemic fauna of Sri Lanka
Salticidae
Taxa named by Eugène Simon
Spiders of Asia
Spiders described in 1900